The 2015 Wuhan Open (also known as 2015 Dongfeng Motor Wuhan Open for sponsorship reasons) was a women's tennis tournament played on outdoor hard courts between September 27 and October 3, 2015. It was part of the WTA Premier 5 tournaments of the 2015 WTA Tour. The 2015 tournament was the 2nd edition of the Wuhan Open. The tournament was held at the Optics Valley International Tennis Center in Wuhan, China.

Points and prize money

Point distribution

Prize money

Singles main-draw entrants

Seeds

 Rankings are as of September 21, 2015

Other entrants
The following players received wild cards into the main singles draw:
  Daniela Hantuchová
  Liu Fangzhou
  Maria Sharapova
  Zheng Saisai

The following player received entry using a protected ranking into the main singles draw:
  Dominika Cibulková

The following players received entry from the singles qualifying draw:
  Tímea Babos
  Lauren Davis
  Mariana Duque Mariño
  Julia Görges
  Johanna Konta
  Danka Kovinić
  Patricia Maria Țig
  Heather Watson

The following players received entry as a lucky loser:
  Ajla Tomljanović

Withdrawals
Before the tournament
  Timea Bacsinszky → replaced by  Alison Riske
  Eugenie Bouchard (ongoing concussion) → replaced by  Ajla Tomljanović
  Karin Knapp → replaced by  Alexandra Dulgheru
  Ekaterina Makarova (leg injury) →  replaced by Varvara Lepchenko
  Flavia Pennetta → replaced by  Mirjana Lučić-Baroni
  Lucie Šafářová (bacterial infection and belly muscle injury) → replaced by  Magdaléna Rybáriková

Retirements
 Victoria Azarenka (left leg injury)
 Belinda Bencic (left thigh injury)
 Garbiñe Muguruza (left ankle injury and gastrointestinal illness)
 Maria Sharapova (left forearm injury)
 CoCo Vandeweghe (left ankle injury)

Doubles main-draw entrants

Seeds

 Rankings are as of September 21, 2015

Other entrants
The following pairs received a wildcard into the doubles main draw:
  Liu Chang /  Yang Zhaoxuan

The following pair received entry as alternates:
  Mona Barthel /  Darija Jurak

Withdrawals
Before the tournament
  Belinda Bencic (Left Thigh Injury)
During the tournament
  Garbiñe Muguruza (Gastrointestinal Illness And Left Ankle Injury)
  Ajla Tomljanović (Right Shoulder Injury)

Champions

Singles

  Venus Williams def.  Garbiñe Muguruza, 6-3  3-0 Retired

Doubles

  Martina Hingis /  Sania Mirza def.  Irina-Camelia Begu /  Monica Niculescu, 6-2 6-3

References

External links
 Official website